Hish (alternatively spelled Heish or Heesh) could refer to the following:

Places
Heshi, Iran, a village in northern Iran
Hish, Syria, a town in northwestern Syria

Other
Hish (Haganah corps)